Vukelić is a Serbian and a Croatian surname.

It is one of the most common surnames in the Lika-Senj County of Croatia.

It may refer to:

Branko Vukelić (1958–2013), politician
Branko Vukelić (1904–1945), spy
Milan Vukelić (1936–2012), footballer
Vesna Vukelić Vendi (born 1971), singer
William Vukelić (born 1998), alpine skier

References

Serbian surnames
Croatian surnames